Pandak may refer to:

Lela Pandak Lam (died 1877), a Malay nationalist
Pandak, Pakistan